GladRags is a company based in Portland, Oregon that produces reusable cloth menstrual pads and the XO Flo menstrual cup.

GladRags was founded in 1993 by Brenda Mallory and Karen Paule. Mallory was inspired by reusable cloth diapers. Tracy Puhl has led the company since 2011. In 2013 Puhl was named Young Entrepreneur of the Year for Oregon and Southwest Washington by the U.S. Small Business Administration. GladRags is owned and operated by women. It is cruelty-free and was first certified as a B corporation in 2012.

GladRags' cloth pads are machine-washable and made from soft cotton flannel that folds and snaps around underwear. Each GladRags cloth pad includes two inserts and a holder and comes in various patterns and colors. They are made to last a minimum of five years and are sometimes used in conjunction with menstrual cups. The company sells the XO Flo reusable silicone menstrual cup.

GladRags partners with a women-owned sewing company and is committed to supporting various organizational causes.

See also
Thinx
Lunapads

References

External links
Official website

Feminine hygiene brands
American brands
Companies based in Portland, Oregon
Manufacturing companies established in 1993
1993 establishments in Oregon
Small business
Benefit corporations